Bryotropha aliterrella is a moth of the family Gelechiidae. It is found in Spain.

The wingspan is 14–15 mm. The forewings are uniform dark grey. The hindwings are grey up to the base. The rest of the hindwings is dark grey. Adults have been recorded on wing in July.

References

Moths described in 1935
aliterrella
Moths of Europe